Jiří Prskavec (born 18 May 1993) is a Czech slalom canoeist who has competed at the international level since 2008.

Career
Prskavec won a bronze medal in the K1 event at the 2016 Summer Olympics in Rio de Janeiro and gold in the K1 event at the 2020 Summer Olympics in Tokyo.

He won nine medals at the ICF Canoe Slalom World Championships with four golds (K1: 2015, 2019; K1 team: 2015, 2017), four silvers (K1: 2013, 2018; K1 team: 2014, 2019) and a bronze (K1 team: 2018). He also won 12 gold, 1 silver and 3 bronze medals at the European Championships.

Prskavec won the overall World Cup title in the K1 class in 2018, 2019 and 2022. He finished the 2016, 2019 and 2020 seasons as the World No. 1.

Prskavec competed at the 2010 Summer Youth Olympics where he won bronze in the K1 slalom event.

His father Jiří is a former slalom canoeist and a medalist from World and European Championships.

Results

World Cup individual podiums

Complete World Cup results

References

External links

1993 births
Czech male canoeists
Living people
Canoeists at the 2010 Summer Youth Olympics
People from Mělník
Canoeists at the 2016 Summer Olympics
Olympic canoeists of the Czech Republic
Olympic bronze medalists for the Czech Republic
Medalists at the 2016 Summer Olympics
Olympic medalists in canoeing
Medalists at the ICF Canoe Slalom World Championships
Olympic gold medalists for the Czech Republic
Medalists at the 2020 Summer Olympics
Canoeists at the 2020 Summer Olympics
Sportspeople from the Central Bohemian Region